Ringolevio (also spelled ringalevio or ring-a-levio) is a children's game which originated in the streets of New York City, where it is known to have been played at least as far back as the late 19th century. It is one of the many variations of tag. It requires close teamwork and near-military strategy. In Canada, the game is known as Relievio, a name which was also used in Boston and Ireland in the 1950s. It is also, in some places, known as coco-levio.

American activist and author Emmett Grogan wrote a fictionalized autobiography called Ringolevio, which was published in 1972. Grogan wrote: "It's a game. A game played on the streets of New York, for as long as anyone can remember. It is called Ringolevio, and the rules are simple. There are two sides, each with the same number of players. There are no time limits, no intermissions, no substitutes and no weapons allowed. There are two jails. There is one objective."

It is believed that the game was brought over from the British Isles, due to its similarities to a game called Bedlams or Relievo. According to Stewart Culin, relievo became ring relievo and then ringoleavio. A similar game, called Prisoner's Base, was played by members of Lewis & Clark's Corps of Discovery against a group of Nez Perce.

Rules 

The game typically splits players into two teams, one of "hunters" and one of "prey". A confined area called "jail" is marked. Games often have set boundaries of how far from the jail pursued players can go.

The goal of the hunting team is to catch the "prey" by grabbing hold of them and performing a chant. This chant varies between regions, with different versions of the game using chants such as "chain chain double chain, no break away" and "Ringolevio, 1-2-3, 1-2-3, 1-2-3". If the pursued person breaks free at any point during this brief recitation, the person is not caught and can still play. If the chant is finished, the hunter takes the prey to jail (also called the "base" in some variations) and the captive is considered "out".

The prey can free captured team members by entering the jail without being caught, tagging the captives and shouting, "All in! All in! Free-all!" (other phrases used include "All in, all in, all in, free allo" and "Olly olly oxen free").

In some variations, the pursuing team cannot station any player of their team within line of sight of the jail. This is called "babysitting" (the term "puppy-guarding" is also used). The cry of "babysitting" can be made by anyone in the jail who feels that any member of the opposing team is lingering near the jail and blocking their rescue.

The goal of the pursuing team is to catch all the members of the other team, and "capture" them in the jail/base. The team being pursued tries to avoid capture and, if possible, free their jailed comrades. The game ends when one team has caught all the members of the opposing team, at which point the teams change their roles.

In popular culture 
In addition to Emmet Grogan's book, the game is mentioned in:

Films
 In Roger Corman's The Young Racers (1963), Robert Machin (Robert Campbell) mentions "Ring-a-Leerio" in conversation with his brother, Joe (his real-life brother William Campbell). 
 The PBS documentary, New York Street Games (2010), as one of the games popular in New York City.
 In the 1998 film Fallen John Goodman shouts "Olly Olly Oxen Free O" upon encountering Denzel Washington.

Literature
 In Stephen King's Hearts in Atlantis, The Waste Lands, and It.
 As ring-a-levio and ring-a-leary-o, in George Carlin's autobiography Last Words.
 As one game played by several kids (including the author himself) in Bob Keeshan's autobiography, Good Morning, Captain.
 As ringolevio in Pat Conroy's Prince of Tides.
 In the Little Italy section of Don DeLillo's novel Underworld.
 In Daniel Keyes's novel Flowers for Algernon when Charlie remembers a playground scene.
 As coco-levio in the book Brown Girl Dreaming by Jacqueline Woodson in the poem called "Game Over".
 In the novel Manhattan Beach by Jennifer Egan.
 In the New Yorker essay Not Becoming My Father by Michael Chabon.
 In Roddy Doyle's Booker prize-winning novel Paddy Clarke Ha Ha Ha.
 In Bill O'Reilly's book A Bold Fresh Piece of Humanity.
 As ringalevio in Jacquelin Woodson's picture book The World Belonged to Us
 As ring-a-levio in Mel Brooks' book All About Me!.

Music
French singer Little Bob called his 1987 album and the title track "Ringolevio".
The rapper Notorious B.I.G. mentions the game, calling it "coco-levo", in the song "Things Done Changed" on his album Ready to Die (1994). He notes that the game is no longer played and this is a symptom of social decline in inner city ghettos.
Ring-a-levio is mentioned in rapper 2pac's song "Old School".
Lyricist Robert Hunter mentions "On the bank where children play 'ring a levio'" in his 1975 song "Tiger Rose".
Relievio is mentioned in Boston-based band Damone's song "On My Mind".
The song "Ringolevio" on the album Snowmads (2019) by hip hop group Onyx.

Television
 A game of ringolevio figures prominently in The Twilight Zone episode "The Incredible World of Horace Ford."
 The Simpsons features a scene where Lisa is hiding and the kids give up looking for her so she cries out "Ollie Ollie Oxen free" two times.
 In The Simpsons'' episode "The D'oh-cial Network," Lisa asks Sherri and Terri to play ringolevio (as "ringolivio") among other games, but is ignored. Later, they play Marco Polo instead.

Notes and references
Notes

Citations

Further reading

Cultural history of New York City
Children's games
Street games
Tag variants